The Dyfi National Nature Reserve, managed by Natural Resources Wales, the successor body to the Countryside Council for Wales, is located  north of Aberystwyth in the county of Ceredigion, Wales
on the Dyfi estuary.

The area was designated as a Nature Reserve in 1969 and consists of three separate areas:

Ynyslas Sand Dunes
Dyfi Estuary Mudflats
Cors Fochno

See also
Borth
Ynyslas
Ynys-hir RSPB reserve

References

External links
 About the reserve at BBC Wales

Nature reserves in Ceredigion
National nature reserves in Wales
Biosphere reserves of Wales
Ramsar sites in Wales